Evildoers Beware! is the third album by Mustard Plug. It was released in March 1997 by Hopeless Records on CD, LP, and cassette. A yellow LP version was reissued in the mid-2010s.

Track listing
 “Box” – 3:24  
 “Suburban Homesick Blues” – 3:05  
 “Never Be” – 2:46  
 “You” – 3:59  
 “Mendoza” – 2:48  
 “Go” – 2:08  
 “Jerry” – 3:51  
 “Not Again” – 3:18 
 “Miss Michigan” – 2:55  
 “Sadie May” – 3:01  
 “Dressed Up” – 3:00  
 “Beer (Song)” – 3:40

Personnel
Colin Clive – Guitar and Vocals
Craig DeYoung – Bass
Brandon Jenison – Trumpet
David Kirchgessner – Vocals
Nick Varano – Drums

Additional Musicians
Kevin “Ray” Dixon – Tenor saxophone
Bleu VanDyke – Trombone
Jim Hofer – Trombone
Mark Petz – Tenor saxophone

References

External links

Evildoers Beware! at YouTube (streamed copy where licensed)

1997 albums
Hopeless Records albums
Mustard Plug albums